Headin' West is a 1922 American silent Western film directed by William James Craft and featuring Hoot Gibson. It is not known if the film survives.

Plot
As described in a film magazine, Bill Perkins (Gibson), a stowaway on a mail plane, escapes by parachuting with his dog onto a farm and, because he cannot ride the worst horse on the ranch, is assigned cooking duties with French cook Honey Giroux (White) and his assistant Potato Polly (Short). A young woman from the neighboring ranch, Ann Forest (Lorraine), takes an interest in Bill because he does not eat with his knife, which brings trouble on both of them from the ranch bully. When Ann is in town shopping, a burr is put under the saddle of her horse and it runs away with her. Bill, however, saves her and whips the bully, compelling him to apologize. The foreman, as a joke, makes Bill the owner of the ranch, but when it turns out that Bill really is the owner, the joke is on them.

Cast
 Hoot Gibson as Bill Perkins
 Gertrude Short as Potato Polly
 Charles Le Moyne as Mark Rivers
 Jim Corey as Red Malone
 Leo White as Honey Giroux
 Louise Lorraine as Ann Forest
 George A. Williams as Barnaby Forest
 Frank Whitson as Stub Allen
 Mark Fenton as Judge Dean

See also
 Hoot Gibson filmography

References

External links

 
 

1922 films
1922 Western (genre) films
American black-and-white films
Films directed by William James Craft
Universal Pictures films
Silent American Western (genre) films
1920s American films
1920s English-language films